679 Pax is a minor planet orbiting the Sun that was discovered by German astronomer August Kopff on January 28, 1909. It is named after Pax, a Roman goddess. It is orbiting the Sun with a period of 4.16 years and an eccentricity of 0.31.

Measurements using the adaptive optics at the W. M. Keck Observatory give a mean diameter of 62 km. This is 16% larger than the diameter estimated using the IRAS observatory. The asteroid is elongated with a size ratio of 1.66 ± 0.23 between the major and minor axes. Photometric measurements reported in 1982 gave a rotation period of 8.452 hours. The asteroid's pole of rotation lies 32° away from the plane of the ecliptic.

Polarimetric study of this asteroid reveals anomalous properties that suggests the regolith consists of a mixture of low and high albedo material. This may have been caused by fragmentation of an asteroid substrate with the spectral properties of CO3/CV3 carbonaceous chondrites.

References

See also
2037 Tripaxeptalis

External links
 
 

Background asteroids
Pax
Pax
I-type asteroids (Tholen)
K-type asteroids (SMASS)
19090128